The Great Post Road ( or ) is the name for the historical road that runs across Java that connects Anyer and Panarukan. It was built during the reign of Herman Willem Daendels (1808–1811), governor-general of the Dutch East Indies, using unpaid forced labor that cost thousands of lives.

Construction

La Grande Route, as Daendels called it, was a military road which was built by the order of King Louis Bonaparte who ruled the Kingdom of Holland at that time, during the Napoleonic Wars. France was at war with England and the road was intended to support the defense of Java by, e.g. making it easier to transfer soldiers and supplies. In 1750, before the road was constructed, connections existed between Batavia (present-day Jakarta) and Semarang and onwards to Surabaya. A north-south connection between Semarang, Surakarta and onwards to Yogyakarta was also available at that time. However, heavy tropical rainfall frequently destroyed them.

Daendels faced difficult conditions in the Dutch East Indies when he started the road construction. The financial situation in the colony was so tight that the Minister of Colonial Affairs in The Hague sent him a letter emphasizing the difficult financial situation and the need to reduce expenditures. The British posed a major threat. Furthermore, there were uprisings in Bantam and Cirebon, and some of Daendels' opponents actively frustrated his endeavors. 

Daendels then decided to use Javanese unpaid forced laborers to perform most of the heavy work, which resulted in thousands of deaths due to the difficult health challenges of the forests and marshes as well as the labor conditions.  Many of Daendels' opponents became historical sources of the harsh conditions during the road construction. Major William Thorn wrote that about 12,000 natives are said to have perished during the construction. Nicolaus Engelhard, who was a governor over most of Java and who had to give up his position to Daendels, stated that 500 workers had died in Megamendung area nearby Buitenzorg (the present-day Bogor), excluding the number of people who died as the result of illness. Furthermore, Engelhard criticized Daendels for the thousand casualties resulting from the road construction in the woods of Weleri in Pekalongan region.

Extent
Today the present Javanese North Coast Road follows by and large the Java Great Post Road. However the original post road runs through the Preanger (Priangan, West Java) highlands, from Meester Cornelis (Jatinegara) south to Buitenzorg (Bogor), and east to Cianjur, Bandung, Sumedang, and Cirebon. The current north coast road however runs through coastal northern West Java and was built after the construction of Daendels' post road. It connects Bekasi, Karawang, and Cirebon. The road originally ran from Anyer, present day Banten, but formerly West Java to Panarukan, East Java, but later was extended to Banyuwangi. In its current form the Java main road extends through five provinces: Banten, DKI Jakarta, West Java, Central Java and East Java.

Cities

The road initially served as the backbone of Java's transportation and logistic. It connects some of the largest cities in Java, including Anyer, Cilegon, Serang, Tangerang, Batavia, Meester Cornelis (today absorbed into Jakarta), Buitenzorg (now Bogor), Cianjur, Bandung, Sumedang, Cirebon, Brebes, Tegal, Pemalang, Pekalongan, Batang, Semarang, Demak, Kudus, Pati, Rembang, Tuban, Lamongan, Surabaya, Sidoarjo, Pasuruan, Probolinggo, Bondowoso, and Panarukan.

Media depiction 
In 1996, Dutch director Bernie IJdis made the film De Groote Postweg ("The Great Post Road"). A central character in the movie is the Indonesian writer Pramoedya Ananta Toer who narrates it. The film has aspects of a road movie, interspersed with shots at Toer's house. It discusses the sacrifices made by the native population during the road's construction, but also exposes the lack of freedom and the rampant corruption of modern-day Indonesia. A censor from the Indonesian government accompanied the crew, and IJdis said afterward he did not expect ever to be let into Indonesia again.

See also

 North Coast Road (Java)

References

External links

Highways in Indonesia
Asian Highway Network